Itapevi–São Paulo (Butantã) Metropolitan Corridor, with  of extension, starts in Itapevi Bus Terminal, connected with CPTM Line 8-Diamond, in Itapevi, and goes to ViaQuatro Butantã station of Line 4-Yellow, in São Paulo. The project reaches the cities of Itapevi, Jandira, Barueri, Carapicuíba, Osasco and São Paulo which total approximately 13 million inhabitants.

In its first phase, the corridor with approximately  connects Itapevi and Jandira, along with stations Itapevi, Engenheiro Cardoso, Sagrado Coração and Jandira.

History
The region interconnected through Estrada Velha de Itu, used by tropeiros for trips between São Paulo, Carapicuíba Village, Santana de Parnaíba, Sorocaba and Itu. Throughout the 20th century, roads were built, as the old road towards Itu was replaced by a highway (current SP-312) on 1 May 1922. This road became (beside Sorocabana railway and future Castelo Branco and Raposo Tavares highways) one of the transport corridors that boosted the region growth, being one of the points of population densification that went there.

In 1934, the first regular bus lines began operating between Carapicuíba, Largo da Batata and Lapa, which became the main regional centres of West Side São Paulo. In the next 30 years, the cities of São Paulo, Santana de Paraíba and Cotia break up, creating new cities: Itapevi (1949), Barueri (1949), Osasco (1962), Carapicuíba (1964) and Jandira (1964).

Until then, the public transportation was controlled by the state through permissions, creating dozens of companies and small vehicle owners. This situation is changed in the 1970s with the creation of EMTU, which starts regulating the intermunicipal lines. In the same decade, the first modernization project of this transport corridor was made. The Prefecture of São Paulo suggests the installing of a trolleybus corridor between Largo da Batata and Osasco. Besides the construction was never initiated, EMTU keeps planning the corridor (now called West Road Corridor) through the 1980s and 1990s.

Gallery

References

External links
 METRA website
 São Paulo Secretariat of Metropolitan Transportation

Transport in São Paulo (state)
Empresa Metropolitana de Transportes Urbanos de São Paulo
Bus rapid transit in São Paulo (state)